Nová Sedlica (Novosedlitsia; , Nova sedlytsia) is the easternmost village and municipality in Slovakia (the easternmost point is the Mt. Kremenec, the tripoint Slovakia-Ukraine-Poland is located at its summit), in Snina District in the Prešov Region.

The village, situated in the buffer zone of the Poloniny National Park, offers easy access to most of the National Park's hiking trails. Stužica, a component of the Primeval Beech Forests of the Carpathians UNESCO World Heritage Site is also close to the village.

In historical records the village was first mentioned in 1630. The municipality lies at an altitude of 421 metres and covers an area of 32.806 km². According to the 2013 census it had 293 inhabitants. The closest town is Snina, 43 km away.

References

External links
 
 
Poloniny National Park at Slovakia.travel 
Poloniny official website at the State Nature Conservancy of the Slovak Republic website 

Villages and municipalities in Snina District